The 1999 British Academy Television Awards were held on 9 May at the Grosvenor House Hotel in Park Lane, London. It was hosted solely by Michael Parkinson, who was due to share hosting duties with Jill Dando until her murder two weeks earlier.

Winners and nominees
Winners are listed first and highlighted in boldface; the nominees are listed below.

Craft Awards

Special Awards
 Richard Curtis

In Memoriam

Ernie Wise
Robin Bailey
Patricia Hayes
Bryan Mosley
Ken Platt
Betty Marsden
Andrew Gardner
Richard Dunn
Johnny Morris
John Hanson
Rod Hull
Sid Green
Trevor Philpott
Mary Millar
Frank Gillard
Robin Ray
Johnny Speight
Robin Nedwell
Derek Nimmo
Bob Peck
Michael Samuelson
Lew Grade
Jill Dando

References

External links

Television1999
1999 awards in the United Kingdom
1999 television awards
1999 in British television
May 1999 events in the United Kingdom